James Anderson McPherson (3 June 1900–18 February 1980) was a New Zealand horticulturist, horticultural administrator and writer. He was born in Dunedin, New Zealand on 3 June 1900.

References

1900 births
1980 deaths
Writers from Dunedin
New Zealand horticulturists
20th-century New Zealand botanists